Bucculatrix pseudosylvella is a moth in the family Bucculatricidae. It was described by Hans Rebel in 1941. It is found in Portugal, North Macedonia and Turkey.

The wingspan is about 6 mm. The forewings are white with blackish-grey markings. The hindwings are whitish-grey.

References

Natural History Museum Lepidoptera generic names catalog

Bucculatricidae
Moths described in 1941
Taxa named by Hans Rebel
Moths of Europe